Krystyna Cherepenina (also spelled Cherepienina; born 21 November 1991) was a Ukrainian group rhythmic gymnast. 

She represents her nation at international competitions. 
She participated at the 2008 Summer Olympics in Beijing.

References

1991 births
Living people
Ukrainian rhythmic gymnasts
Place of birth missing (living people)
Gymnasts at the 2008 Summer Olympics
Olympic gymnasts of Ukraine
21st-century Ukrainian women